Mariano Martín Donda (born 25 March 1982 in Buenos Aires) is an Argentine footballer. Donda holds European Union nationality.

Donda started his professional career with Nueva Chicago in 2003. The club were relegated from the Argentine Primera in 2004, but Donda chose to stay with the club and helped them to earn promotion back to the Primera in 2006. At the end of the 2006–07 season, Nueva Chicago were relegated after losing their promotion playoff, this defeat prompted Donda's move to join Bari.

On 26 July 2010, Donda terminated the contract with Bari in mutual consent.

Donda then joined the Emirates club Al Wasl for the 2011–12 season. He missed the entire 2012–13 season due to his knee injury.

Honours
Serie B: 2009
 Silver medal in GCC Champions League: 2012

References

External links
 Argentine Primera statistics at Fútbol XXI  
 

1982 births
Living people
Footballers from Buenos Aires
Argentine footballers
Argentine expatriate footballers
Nueva Chicago footballers
Godoy Cruz Antonio Tomba footballers
S.S.C. Bari players
Association football midfielders
Expatriate footballers in Italy
Expatriate footballers in the United Arab Emirates
Serie B players
Argentine expatriate sportspeople in Italy
Al-Wasl F.C. players
Argentine expatriate sportspeople in the United Arab Emirates
UAE Pro League players